Márta Lacza (born December 2, 1946) is a Hungarian graphic artist and portrait painter. She has one brother Jozsef Lacza who lives in Canada Toronto with his son Peter Anthony Lacza.

She was born in the Csepel district of Budapest in 1946. In 1967, she graduated from Fine Arts High School and then studied from 1970 to 1974 at the Hungarian Academy of Fine Arts under Simon Sarkantyú and Károly Raszler. Since then, she has had numerous solo exhibitions at home and abroad, and her works have been shown in London, Hamburg, Eindhoven, Ghent, Copenhagen and Athens.

She was awarded a Derkovits Scholarship (1980–1983) and won the Munkácsy Prize in 1983. A 40-minute television programme about her, titled A Tv galériája. Lacza Márta grafikusművész (The TV gallery. Lacza Martha graphic artist), was broadcast on Magyar Televízió, the Hungarian national public broadcaster, in March 1982.

She took part in the first "Frans Masereel Rijkscentrum voor graphite" international graphic artists' colony in Belgium, and was called back every year for fourteen years. She also participated in the work of Atelier Nord in Norway.

She is known for her oil paintings, drawings in pencil or chalk, etchings and illustrations for many books. Her work is described as combining mood, thought creativity and personal vision with "unmatched skill and preparedness coupled with outstanding craftmanship". Her paintings show "mysterious, sometimes almost bizarre figures" that "provoke emotion from observers."

Her illustrations have been published in a number of books, including the Hungarian translation of the Anne of Green Gables series of children's books by Lucy Maud Montgomery translated by Katalin Szűr-Szabó, and books of Hungarian folktales such as The Silver King's Flute by Zsigmond Móricz, and The Tree That Reached the Sky. She and her husband also illustrated academic volumes such as Hajdú-Bihar megye 10-11. századi sírleletei, and The late neolithic of the Tisza region (1987).

Her autobiography, Élet és Művészet (Life and Art), was published in Budapest in 2007.

She and her husband, artist Dékány Ágoston (died 28 August 2015), lived and worked in the Csepel district of Budapest.

Solo exhibitions
Her solo exhibitions include:
1975 Joseph Municipal Culture House, Budapest
1976 Purple School, New Palace, Budapest
1978 Studio Gallery, Budapest
1979 Pesterzsébeti Museum, Budapest
1980 Chili Gallery, Budapest
1981 Theatre Gallery, Budapest
1982 TV Gallery, Budapest; Culture House, Siófok; Turnhout, Belgium
1983 Bastion Gallery, Budapest; Fórum Szálloda; Galerie Mensch, Hamburg
1984 Miskolc; Fórum Galéria, Budapest
1985 Turnhout, Belgium
1990 Elizabeth City Gallery, Budapest
1995 Color Games

Works 
Works acquired by the Janus Pannonius Múzeum:
Négy évszak, pen/ink on paper, 275 × 402 mm
Tópart, 1978, lithography on paper, 475 × 570 mm
Belső udvar, pencil on paper, 312 × 440 mm
Arcuk egy-egy kis külváros, 1980, p. szín. cer, 370 × 545 mm
Információ, pencil on paper, 370 × 550 mm
Szólíthatom Jánosnak? , pencil on paper, 395 × 550 mm
Pára, pencil on paper, 385 × 545 mm
Félsziget, 1984, pencil on paper, 340 × 510 mm
Túlsó part, pencil on paper, 280 × 395 mm

Other works include:

 Autóbusz
 Félnyolc
 Gyere be
 Gyógygödör
 Gyógyvíz
 Mester

 Madarak
 Merengő
 Katyiba
 Piac
 Szőrmekereskedő
 Tükör

 Habok
 Najádok
 Harmadosztály (1985)
 Ködös történetek (1986)
 Küszöb (1988)
 Ginkgo biloba (1992)

References

Hungarian painters
Hungarian illustrators
Hungarian women painters
Hungarian women illustrators
Hungarian children's book illustrators
1946 births
Living people